James Desborough may refer to:
 James Desborough (journalist)
 James Desborough (game designer)